Litsea cubeba, the aromatic litsea or may chang, is an evergreen tree or shrub 5–12 meters high in the family Lauraceae. It is native to Southern Chinese region including Sichuan, Guizhou, Yunnan, Taiwan and Fujian, and Southeast Asian countries such as Indonesia, Malaysia and Cambodia. It is called "mountain pepper" (山胡椒; pinyin: shānhújiāo), "mujiangzi" （木姜子; pinyin: mùjiāngzǐ）or "douchijiang" (豆豉姜; pinyin: dòuchǐjiāng) in Mandarin and maqaw (馬告) by the Atayal of Taiwan. It produces a fruit which is processed for its lemony essential oil. The oil can also be extracted from the leaf, but this is considered to be lower in quality. The timber is sometimes used for making furniture and crafts. Plant parts are also used in medicine.

Oil extraction
Essential oil yields from the fruit are 3–5%. The oil's main component is citral, at 70–85% of the oil. It is mainly produced in China from plantations and is marketed as "Litsea cubeba", with production estimates between 500 and 1,500 tonnes of oil per annum. The oil is used as a fragrance (especially in bar soap) and for flavouring in its own right. It is also used as a raw material by the chemical industry for the synthesis of vitamin A and violet-like fragrances.

As a spice
It is used extensively as a spice by the aboriginal peoples of Taiwan, it is seen as a distinguishing feature of aboriginal cuisine.

References

External links
 Useful New Plants (L. cubeba)

cubeba
Fruits originating in Asia
Flora of Assam (region)
Flora of Bangladesh
Flora of Bhutan
Flora of China
Flora of East Himalaya
Flora of Indo-China
Flora of Japan
Flora of Malesia
Flora of Myanmar
Flora of Nepal
Flora of Taiwan
Flora of Tibet
Taiwanese cuisine